Shadow Dancing may refer to:

 Shadow Dancing (album), a 1978 album by Andy Gibb
 "Shadow Dancing" (song), a 1978 song on the album of the same name
 "Shadow Dancing" (Babylon 5), a 1996 Babylon 5 episode
 Shadow dancing, a variation of the country/western two-step

See also
 Shadow play, a form of ancient Chinese puppetry